Henry Enrique Estrada (born March 16, 1949) is an American actor and police officer. He is known for his co-starring lead role as California Highway Patrol officer Francis (Frank) Llewelyn "Ponch" Poncherello in the police drama television series CHiPs, which ran from 1977 to 1983.  He later became known for his work in Spanish-language telenovelas, his appearances in reality television shows and infomercials and as a regular voice on the Adult Swim series Sealab 2021.

Early life 
Estrada was born on March 16, 1949, in East Harlem, Manhattan, New York, the son of Carmen Moreno, a seamstress, and Renildo Estrada. His parents are of Puerto Rican descent. Growing up, he thought about becoming a police officer but turned to acting after joining the drama club at Louis D. Brandeis High School.

Career

1970–2000
In the 1970 film version of The Cross and the Switchblade, Estrada made his film debut in the role of Nicky Cruz alongside Pat Boone, who played the role of David Wilkerson. 
In 1972, Estrada co-starred with George C. Scott and Stacy Keach as LAPD Officer Sergio Duran in the movie The New Centurions.
In 1973, Estrada co-starred in season 5, episode 22, of the CBS TV series Hawaii Five-O: "Engaged to be Buried".
In 1974, Estrada took part in the disaster film, Airport 1975, where he played a role as Julio the flight engineer on a Boeing 747. His character was killed in a midair collision. Two years later, he was a player in the military historical epic Midway, as a fictional airman Ens. "Chili Bean" Ramos.

Starting in 1977, Estrada co-starred as Frank "Ponch" Poncharello in the TV series CHiPs.  In 1978, he began training in martial arts with SeishinDo Kenpo instructor Frank Argelander (Frank Landers), to prepare for a two-part episode of the series. The two appeared on the cover of Fighting Stars Magazine that same year, discussing Estrada's training regimen. On Monday, August 6, 1979, Estrada was seriously injured while filming a scene on the set of CHiPs, fracturing several ribs and breaking both wrists after he was thrown from his  motorcycle.

Later in 1979, Estrada was voted one of "The 10 Sexiest Bachelors in the World" by People magazine and was featured on the cover of the November issue. Following a salary dispute with NBC in the fall of 1981, Estrada was briefly replaced by Olympic Gold Medalist and actor Caitlyn Jenner. CHiPs was eventually canceled in 1983. In the 1980s, Estrada appeared in a string of low-budget films. He made a return to series television in a 1987 three-part episode of the police drama Hunter.

In the 1990s, Estrada played the role of Johnny, a Tijuana trucker, in the Televisa telenovela Dos mujeres, un camino ("Two women, one path"). He shared the main credits with Mexican actresses/singers Laura Leon and Bibi Gaytán. Originally slated for 100 episodes, the show went to 200-plus episodes and became the biggest telenovela in Latin American history. He was reportedly paid 1 million pesos for that role.

In 1994, Estrada began co-hosting the syndicated outdoor adventure show American Adventurer, which ran until 2004. In 1995, he made a special guest appearance as Ponch in punk rock band Bad Religion's music video "Infected", as well as in the video for the Butthole Surfers's video for "Pepper". He has also been seen on a few episodes of Sabrina, The Teenage Witch as himself, seen in a daydream cloud in Hilda's mind and driving a car as Hilda zapped herself in his car.

In 1997, Estrada wrote his autobiography, Erik Estrada: My Road from Harlem to Hollywood. In 1998, he returned as the character Francis "Ponch" Poncherello in the TNT made-for-TV movie CHiPs '99, along with the rest of the original cast.

2000–present

In 2001, Estrada landed a role on the daytime drama The Bold and the Beautiful as Eduardo Dominguez. In 2002, he played a game-show host on the Disney Channel series Lizzie McGuire with Hilary Duff. He also made a guest appearance on an episode of Spy TV in 2002. He has also had a regular role doing voiceovers for the Cartoon Network show Sealab 2021, where he would parody himself. He also appeared in an episode of another Cartoon Network show, Space Ghost: Coast to Coast, which features a character named Moltar who has an obsession with Estrada and CHiPS, as a guest. Estrada has also guest-starred on the children's cartoon Maya and Miguel.

Estrada has appeared in music videos, such as Eminem's music video "Just Lose It". A band named after him (Estradasphere) is based in Santa Cruz, California. Estrada also made guest appearances on The Wayans Bros., Unhappily Ever After, the Nickelodeon comedy Drake & Josh, NBC's Scrubs and My Name is Earl, and ABC's According to Jim.

Estrada has done a long-running series of infomercials as a national spokesman for National Recreational Properties, selling undeveloped real estate property in such locations as Siskiyou County, California; Lake Shastina, California; California City, California; Ocean Shores, Washington; Colorado; and recently, Tellico Village, Tennessee and Bella Vista, Arkansas.

Estrada began appearing in Burger King TV commercials in September 2009 where he attended a class on endorsing products led by race car driver Tony Stewart.  During the spoof, Estrada seeks to understand why American consumers were not interested in purchasing his "Estrada" sunglasses that noticeably had his last name written boldly across the lens.

Estrada has appeared in recent years in a number of reality television shows. In 2004, he starred in both the second season of The Surreal Life and in Discovery Health Body Challenge. He also starred in the short-lived CBS reality show, Armed & Famous. In 2008, Estrada appeared in Husband for Hire, a television movie starring Nadine Velazquez and Mario López. After a series of specials, in 2010, Estrada and Laura McKenzie began co-hosting a weekly series, The World's Funniest Moments, which began as a myNetworkTV series hosted by Arsenio Hall.

Erik Estrada was a contestant on the second season of the Spanish Univision reality show Mira Quien Baila, where 10 contestants are chosen to perform different styles of dancing, and each Sunday, one of them is eliminated. In 2013, he starred in Finding Faith, a film about a young teenager who is kidnapped from a meeting planned online. The story of sexual predation is based on true incidents investigated by the Internet Crimes Against Children Task Force. Estrada toured with the film, aiming to educate parents and young people about the dangers of online grooming.

Activism 
In 2000, Estrada was named the international "Face" of D.A.R.E. which is a campaign against drugs. He also speaks out for the American Heart Association, the United Way, and the C.H.P. 11-99 Foundation, a nonprofit organization that provides benefits and scholarships to California Highway Patrol family members, as well as funeral expenses for fallen officers. Estrada's experience in CHiPs led him to become a reserve officer for the Muncie Police Department in Muncie, Indiana. Estrada became spokesperson for the C.H.P.'s "car seat inspection and installation" program. He has made numerous appearances supporting automobile child-seat safety checks across the country. He appeared in Española, New Mexico, on May 28, 2009, to promote the "100 Days and Nights of Summer" traffic safety and anti-DWI campaign that involves the New Mexico State Police.

Law enforcement 
Estrada became a reserve police officer for the Muncie (Indiana) Police Department. From there, Estrada moved to Virginia, where he was an I.C.A.C. (Internet Crimes Against Children) investigator for eight years in Bedford County, Virginia. As of July 1, 2016, he was a reserve police officer in St. Anthony, Idaho. In the course of his duties, Estrada has been filmed patrolling on a police motorcycle.

Personal life
Estrada was married to Joyce Miller in November 1979; the couple divorced in 1980 and had no children.  Estrada was married to Peggy Lynn Rowe, an entertainment executive, songwriter, and producer from 1985 until 1990, when they divorced. The couple had two sons, Anthony Erik (born 1986), and pole-vaulter Brandon Michael-paul (born 1987).  In 1997, Estrada married film sound technician Nanette Mirkovich. They have one daughter, Francesca Natalia (born 2000). He lives in Studio City, California, U.S.

During an episode of Watch What Happens Live in January 2019 Marie Osmond told host Andy Cohen that she had briefly dated Erik.

Estrada is a member of the Blue Knights motorcycle club. He also rides with the Loyal Order of Moose fraternal and service organization.

Estrada endorsed Republican John McCain in the 2008 United States presidential election.

Estrada was the celebrity guest of the Pekin Marigold Festival in Pekin, Illinois, in September 2017.

Filmography

Film

1970: The Cross and the Switchblade as Nicky Cruz
1971: Chrome and Hot Leather (uncredited)
1972: The Ballad of Billie Blue (aka Jail Breakin' ) as Justin
1972: Parades as Chicano
1972: The New Centurions as Sergio
1974: Airport 1975 as Julio
1976: Trackdown as Chucho
1976: Midway as Ensign Ramos
1977: Fire! (1977 film) as Frank (TV Movie)
1980: The Line 
1983: Where Is Parsifal? as Henry Board II
1985: Light Blast as Inspector Ronn Warren
1985: The Repenter as Salvo Lercara
1987: Hour of the Assassin as Martin Fierro
1988: Andy Colby's Incredible Adventure
1989: Alien Seed as Dr. Stone
1989: The Lost Idol
1990: Twisted Justice as Commander Gage
1990: A Show of Force as Machado
1990: Night of the Wilding as Joseph
1990: Caged Fury as Victor
1990: Spirits as Father Anthony Vicci
1990: Guns as Juan Degas / Jack of Diamonds
1991: Earth Angel
1991: Do or Die as Richard 'Rico' Estevez
1991: Gang Justice as Billy's Father
1992: The Last Riders as Johnny
1992: The Divine Enforcer as Monsignor
1992: Tuesday Never Comes as Micelli
1992: The Naked Truth as Gonzales
1992: The Sounds of Silence as Lester Maldonado
1993: National Lampoon's Loaded Weapon 1 as Officer Francis Poncherello
1993: Angel Eyes as Johnny Ventura
1994: Juana la puta
1995: The Misery Brothers as Himself
1995: The Final Goal as Rameriez
1998: Visions as Detctive Francisco Moreno
1998: The Modern Adventures of Tom Sawyer as Joe
1998: Shattered Dreams as Fredrick
1998: Lost in Hollywood
1999: King Cobra as Bernie Alvarez
2000: Oliver Twisted as Dr. Castaneda
2000: Destroying America
2000: We Married Margo as Himself
2001: UP, Michigan! as Edward Manchester
2002: National Lampoon's Van Wilder as Himself
2004: Border Blues as Mexican Cop Morales
2007: Kickin It Old Skool
2007: Mother Goose Parade as Honorary Grand Marshall
2007: Husband for Hire (TV movie) as Victor Diaz
2008: 2nd Semester of Spanish, Spanish Love Song
2011: Horrorween as Contractor
2012: Highway as Sanchez
2012: Spring Break '83 as Himself
2012: Cool Cat Stops Bullying as Himself 
2012: Cool Cat in the Hollywood Christmas Parade as Hollywood Parade MC (uncredited?)
2013: Finding Faith as Sheriff Brown
2013: Chupacabra vs. The Alamo (TV movie) as Carlos Seguin
2013: This Is Our Time as Mr. Rowley
2013: Templar Nation as Alfred De Molay
2014: Planes: Fire & Rescue as Nick 'Loop'n' Lopez (voice)
2015: Cool Cat Saves the Kids as Himself (reused footage from Cool Cat Stops Bullying and Cool Cat in the Hollywood Christmas Parade)
2015: Virtuous as Jack Evans
2015: Uncommon as Marc Garcia
2016: El Americano: The Movie as Punch (voice)
2017: CHiPs as Paramedic (uncredited)
2018: Cool Cat Kids Superhero as Himself (re-cut of Cool Cat Saves the Kids)
2022: Cool Cat Saves the Kids: The Director's Cut as Himself (re-cut of Cool Cat Kids Superhero)
2023: A Knight to Remember as Mi Ultimo

Television

 1973 - Hawaii Five-O - Rono Vidalgo (Episode: "Engaged to Be Buried")
 1974 - Emergency! - Man with Eye Injury (uncredited)
 1975 - Kojak - Luis (Episode: "Close Cover Before Killing")
 1975 - Mannix - Tropic (Episode: "Man in a Trap")
 1975 - Kolchak: The Night Stalker - Pepe Torres (Episode: "Legacy of Terror")
 1975 - Medical Center - Mike Moneda (Episode: "The High Cost of Winning")
 1975 - Police Woman - Benny Bates (Episode: "Don't Feed the Pigeons")
 1975 - The Six Million Dollar Man - Prince Sakari (Episode: "The Deadly Test")
 1976 - Baretta - Ortiz (Episode: "Dead Man Out")
 1976 - Barnaby Jones - Ruben (Episode: "Shadow of Guilt")
 1976 - The Quest: The Longest Drive - Santos
 1977 - Fire! (TV movie) - Frank
 1977–1983 - CHiPs - Officer Frank Poncherello
 1978 - The Love Boat - Jim Warren (Episode: "Julie's Aunt/Where Is It Written?/The Big Deal")
 1982 - Honeyboy (TV movie) - Rico 'Honeyboy' Ramirez
 1983 - Un solo corazón - Luis
 1987 - Hunter (TV series) - Sgt. Brad Navarro
 1987 - Rosa salvaje - Teniente Rocha
 1988 - The Dirty Dozen: The Fatal Mission (TV movie) - Carmine D'Agostino
 1988 - Alfred Hitchcock Presents - Vinnie Pacelli (Episode: "The Big Spin")
 1989 - She Knows Too Much (TV movie) - Jimmy Alvarez
 1991 - Extralarge: Cannonball - Gonzales
 1991 - Earth Angel (TV movie) - Duke
 1993 - Extralarge: Gonzales' Revenge - Gonzales
 1993–1994 - Dos mujeres, un camino - Juan Daniel Villegas 'Johnny'
 1994 - American Adventurer - Host
 1995 - The Nanny - Himself (Episode: "Kindervelt Days")
 1995 - Cybill - Himself (Guest appearance)
 1996 - The Wayans Bros. - Himself (Guest appearance)
 1996 - Panic in the Skies! (TV movie) - Ethan Walker
 1996 - Pauly - Himself (Guest appearance)
 1996–1997 - Sabrina the Teenage Witch - Himself (Guest appearance)
 1997 - Over the Top - Himself (Guest appearance)
 1997 - We Are Angels - Graciano
 1997 - Baywatch - Captain Huntington (Episode: "Search & Rescue")
 1997 - Space Ghost Coast to Coast
 1997 - Martin - Chip (Episode: "You Play Too Much")
 1997 - Homeboys in Outer Space - Dork (Episode: "How the West Was Lost or, Daddy's Home")
 1998 - CHiPs '99 (TV movie) - Officer Frank 'Ponch' Poncherello
 1998 - King of the Hill - Mexican Judge (Episode: "Peggy's Pageant Fever")
 1999 - Family Guy - Ponch (Episode: "I Never Met the Dead Man")
 1999 - Walker, Texas Ranger - Brock (Episode: "The Lynn Sisters")
 1999 - Pacific Blue - Julio Constanza (Episode: "Stargazer")
 1999–2000 - Walking After Midnight
 2000 - Popular - Himself (Guest appearance)
 2000 - Son of the Beach - President Seymour Wences (Episode: "South of Her Border")
 2000–2005 - Sealab 2021 - Marco (voice)
 2001 - The Bold and the Beautiful - Eduardo Dominguez
 2001 - Shasta McNasty - Himself (Guest appearance)
 2002 - Lizzie McGuire - Alejandro (Episode: "El oro de Montezuma")
 2002 - American Family - Police Officer (Episode: "The Barber Shop")
 2002–2005 - ¡Mucha Lucha! - El Custodio (voice)
 2003 - Scrubs - Himself (Guest appearance)
 2004 - Higglytown Heroes - Ambulance Driver/Paramedic Hero (voice) (Episode: "Kip Joins the Circus/Baby Boom")
 2004 - Drake & Josh - Police Officer (Episode: "Driver's License")
 2004 - The Surreal Life (cast member in 2004)
 2004 - Maya & Miguel (voice)
 2005 - Taylor Made (TV movie) - William Santos
 2005 - The King of Queens - Himself (Voice appearance)
 2006 - According to Jim - Himself (Guest appearance)
 2006 - Back to the Grind - (unsold pilot)
 2007 - Armed & Famous - (canceled after 4 episodes)
 2008 - Life - Himself (Guest appearance)
 2009 - My Name Is Earl - Himself (Guest appearance on 2 episodes)
 2009 - Meet the Browns - Francisco / Mr. Hernandez (Episode: "Meet the Mexican")
 2009 - "Burger King" Commercial
 2009 - Cop Talk 2010 - Big Time Rush - Carlos' Dad (Episode: "Big Time Break")
 2010 - World's Funniest Moments 2010–2012 - Adventure Time - King Worm
 2011 - Mira Quien Baila (Univision)
 2013 - Second Generation Wayans - Mr. Martinez (Episode: "Miss Independent")
 2014 - The Neighbors 2016 - Liv and Maddie 2017 - Still the King 2020 - Picture Perfect Mysteries''

References

External links

 
 Erik Estrada's website
 Erik Estrada's California Pines infomercial review

1949 births
Living people
American deputy sheriffs
American male film actors
American male telenovela actors
American male television actors
American people of Puerto Rican descent
American police officers
CHiPs
Hispanic and Latino American male actors
Male actors from New York City
New York (state) Republicans
People from East Harlem